McKetta is a surname. Notable people with the surname include:

Frank McKetta (1917–2006), American police chief
John J. McKetta (1915–2019), American chemical engineer